New Barnet railway station is in the London Borough of Barnet in north London, England. The station is managed and served by Great Northern. Oyster card pay-as-you-go can now be used to and from this station as well as on the majority of National Rail services in Greater London.

History
On 1 May 1884, the station was renamed New Barnet. The goods yard closed in 1966. In 1896, the station was rebuilt to its modern form by re-siting the down platform opposite the existing up platform and providing a new brick structure on the new platform.

On 7 July 1989, the original station booking office, mounted on the station bridge linking the platforms, was badly damaged in an arson attack. The building had just undergone an expensive restoration which made it one of the best such structures in the London area. A Nissen hut was provided in replacement on the western side of the station before a permanent structure was eventually provided.

Facilities
Following the major station refurbishment in 2005, a café was opened in the previously unused building on the southbound, central London-bound platform. In autumn 2008, a new SHERE self-service ticket machine, accepting both cash and credit cards, was installed here (and similarly at other local FCC stations). The station serves the area of New Barnet and the small shopping parade around East Barnet Road.

Services
Off-peak, all services at New Barnet are operated by Great Northern using  EMUs.

The typical off-peak service in trains per hour is:
 2 tph to 
 2 tph to 

During the peak hours, the service is increased to 4 tph in each direction.

The station is also served by a small number of Thameslink operated services to and from  via the Thameslink Core. These services are operated using  EMUs.

Connections
London Buses routes 107, 184, 307, 326, 383 and 384 serve the station.

References

External links 

Railway stations in the London Borough of Barnet
DfT Category D stations
Former Great Northern Railway stations
Railway stations in Great Britain opened in 1850
Railway stations served by Govia Thameslink Railway
New Barnet